Margaret Rosetta "Margot" Brazier  is a professor at the University of Manchester's School of Law.

Margaret is married to Rodney Brazier, a professor of constitutional law also at the University of Manchester.

Academic work
Brazier researches legal issues in the field of medicine, including medical ethics. She is a barrister, ex-member of the Arts and Humanities Research Council (1998-2001), Editor of the Medical Law Review, and ex-president of the Society of Legal Scholars (formerly, Society of Public Teachers of Law) (1997-1999). Brazier was elected a Fellow of the British Academy in 2014, the United Kingdom's national academy for the humanities and social sciences.

She has chaired a number of committees, including:
Chair of the Animal Procedures Committee 1993–98.
Chair of Review of Surrogacy Arrangements 1996–98.
Chair of the Retained Organs Commission 2001–2004.
Chair of the Nuffield Council on Bioethics Working Party The Ethics of Prolonging Life in Fetuses and the Newborn 2004–2006.

Recognition
Order of the British Empire (1997).
Fellow of the Royal Society of Arts (1993).
Fellow of the Academy of Medical Sciences (2007).
Queen's Counsel (honoris causa) (2008).
Fellow of the British Academy (2014).

References

British King's Counsel
Academics of the University of Manchester
Officers of the Order of the British Empire
Fellows of the British Academy
Fellows of the Academy of Medical Sciences (United Kingdom)
21st-century King's Counsel
Honorary King's Counsel
1950 births
Living people
Place of birth missing (living people)